Live @ Lizotte's is the first live album by Australian country music singer Beccy Cole. The album was released in October 2007 and peaked at number 63 on the ARIA Charts in January 2008.

A spokesman for her record label said "The album presents Beccy at her finest; on stage at Lizottes, Beccy performed her most loved songs and some new ones and some unforgettable covers."

Background
Cole says she came up with the concept of recording a live album was to get some of the stories behinds the songs right.

Reception
Susan Jarvis from Capital News said; "Beccy has managed to capture the infectious fun, irreverence, slightly risqué humour and warmth of her live performance and "bottle" it – on her first live album. If you've never seen Beccy live, this album really does convey what it's about, and Live @ Lizotte's is bound to boost her ticket sales." adding "This is everything a live album should be, and more. It's warm and funny, intimate and moving. And it really does make you feel like you’re part of a dynamic live show."

Singles
"Lifeboats" was released as a single from the album. The lyrics question feminism and ask in the case of a sinking ship, If women still get to use the lifeboats first.

Track listing
CD
 "Men Don't Dance" – 3:03
 "Better Woman" – 2:38
 "Intro to Blackwood Hill" – 0:52
 "Blackwood Hill" – 4:48
 "Intro to Lifeboat" – 0:33
 "Lifeboat" – 3:50
 "Intro to Sorry I Asked" – 0:39
 "Sorry I Asked" – 4:38
 "Intro to Girls Out Here" – 3:21
 "Girls out Here" – 4:44
 "Intro to Opposite Prayers" – 0:52
 "Opposite Prayers" – 4:02
 "Intro to Those Memories of You" – 0:50
 "Those Memories of You"  (featuring Kasey Chambers)  – 4:01
 "Intro to Natural Woman" – 1:00
 "Natural Woman" – 3:11
 "Lazy Bones" – 10:00
 "Intro to Galleries of Pink Galahs" – 0:57
 "Galleries of Pink Galahs"  (featuring Gina Jeffreys and Sara Storer)  – 4:12
 "Intro to What's Up" – 1:00
 "What's Up?" – 5:55
 "Say You Love Me" – 4:31
 "Poster Girl (Wrong Side of the World)" – 4:08

DVD
 "Lifeboat"	
 "Those Memories of You"	
 "Galleries of Pink Galahs"	
 "What's Up"
 "Poster Girl (Wrong Side of the World)"	
 "Say You Love Me"	
 "Strong Enough to Bend"

Charts

Weekly charts

Year-end charts

Musicians
 Rod McCormack, Mal Lancaster – drums
 Michael Rose – pedal steel and dobro
 James Gillard – bass
 Mick Albeck – fiddle.

Release history

References

2007 live albums
Live albums by Australian artists
Beccy Cole albums
Albums produced by Rod McCormack